ABCS may mean:
Army Battle Command System
Aeromedical Biological Containment System
ABCS, callsign for the Australian Broadcasting Corporation's TV station in Ceduna, South Australia
ABCS Tournament, an international association football competition

See also
ABC (disambiguation)
ABCs